Walter Zvi Soriano (born 24 December 1967) is a British-Israeli businessman. He is CEO and owner of several companies, including USG Security Ltd., a UK-based firm specializing in litigation support, crisis management and asset tracing, and WSLM, a real estate management company. Soriano is a family friend of former Israeli Prime Minister Benjamin Netanyahu.

Early life
Soriano was born in Argentina, and immigrated to Israel as a young man. He served in the Israel Defense Forces as an intelligence officer, and later moved to London.

Career
On 3 October 2002 Soriano set up an international security company called the Universe Security Group, based in London. The company's board of directors also included Nahum Admoni, who served as the Director-General of the Mossad from 1982 to 1989, and Uri Sagi, former head of the Military Intelligence Directorate, and Albert Raes, Former Director of the Belgian State Security Service (VSSE) from 1977 to 1990.

In 2004, Universe Security Group was appointed by the AMP (Panama Maritime Association) as a RSO (Recognized Security Organization) to certify ship security plans in accordance with the ISPS (International Ship and Port Facility Security) code.

In 2007, Soriano and Universe Security Group were involved in a trade deal to sell three Bell 212 helicopters, which served the Spanish Fire Department, to the Georgian Ministry of Defense through the mediation of Gal Hirsch, a former Israeli brigadier general, while Hirsch served as an adviser to the Georgian Defense Minister.

Between 2008 and 2011, Soriano was hired by billionaire entrepreneur Ruth Parasol and her then-husband Russ DeLeon to help resolve a criminal investigation that took place against them in the United States, for violating the Unlawful Internet Gambling Enforcement Act of 2006. Following Soriano's involvement, Parasol's company, PartyGaming, eventually entered a non-prosecution agreement with the Justice Department.

In 2010 Soriano set up a new company called USG Security, which replaced Universe Security Group. The company "provides security, intelligence and investigation services to private and corporate clients in the UK and around the world", according to its website.

In 2013, Soriano founded "WS London Management" (WSLM), a real estate company based in London.

Soriano owns or co-owns other companies, including "Tov 7", "Tov 77", "Crossroads Property 2" and "London Western Ranch", companies that are engaged in real estate development and management in the UK. He was also previously the owner of "Football Universe Limited" and acted as Diego Maradona's official European representative.

In June 2019, it was reported that Soriano was asked to participate voluntarily in a closed-door hearing by the United States Senate on Russia's interference in the 2016 US presidential election. However, the Senate's intelligence committee's report eventually concluded that Soriano introduced Russian businessmen Oleg Deripaska and Dmitri Rybolovlev to Israeli company Psy Group for private projects, and found no connection to the US elections.

In March 2020, Soriano founded the Anti-Cyberbullying Association in the UK. According to its website, the association is "working (together) to end cyberbullying" through legislation and regulation.

In May 2020, Soriano joined the board of directors of PAVOCAT, a company that provides anti-corruption services to companies and governments.

Links to Benjamin Netanyahu
In 2000, Soriano was one of the founders of an association commemorating the name and memory of Jonathan Netanyahu, brother of Benjamin Netanyahu, who was killed in Operation Entebbe. That same year, Soriano produced "Yoni", a film about Jonathan Netanyahu's life, directed by Semion Vinokur. The film incorporated archived materials from various sources, including the IDF video archives, the IDF spokesman archives, and the Netanyahu family.

After Netanyahu lost the elections to Ehud Barak in 1999, he temporarily retired from politics and went into private business. During that time, according to Soriano, he worked with Netanyahu on a number of high-tech ventures in the United States. In 2002, Soriano recruited Netanyahu for paid lectures at fundraising evenings held in Mexico City for the "Lev Malka Organization", which helps patients from low-income families. The story was published by Israeli newspaper Yedioth Ahronoth, which claimed that Netanyahu was paid $180,000 for two days of work. Soriano confirmed to the newspaper that while living in Jerusalem, he had close ties with Netanyahu and that their relationship was based on "years of deep friendship, devoid of any external interests".    

In early 2018, Police Commissioner Roni Alsheikh was interviewed by Israeli journalist Ilana Dayan. In the interview, Alsheikh said, among other things, that private investigators are gathering information against Lahav 433 officers involved in investigating Netanyahu's cases. Media reports, starting with Raviv Drucker on Israeli Army Radio, raised the possibility that Walter Soriano was behind this activity, which both Soriano and Netanyahu denied. Netanyahu added that he has not met Soriano or talked to him since 2010. No proof of Soriano's involvement was ever published. Israeli news site Behadrey Haredim stated that they received a letter from Alsheikh to Soriano dated February 2018, in which Alsheikh wrote that in his statements regarding the affair Soriano's name was never mentioned.

Legal disputes 
Over the past several years, Soriano has initiated several lawsuits and legal disputes involving information or articles published about him.

In February 2018, Soriano filed a ILS 500,000 defamation claim against Israeli Journalist Raviv Drucker, and in May 2019 filed a second claim for ILS 580,000 against Drucker, together with the website HaAyin HaShevi'it, journalist Oren Persico and editor Shuki Tausig, claiming all four have been coordinating to publish stories to harm his reputation.

In March 2018, Soriano sued Israeli news site Behadrey Haredim for ILS 300,000 following two articles they published alleging Soriano's involvement in the Roni Alsheikh case. On 26 December 2019 the two parties agreed to a settlement in which the news site agreed to remove the articles about Soriano, issue an apology and donate 35,000 NIS to charity.

In October 2019, Soriano sued Twitter in Dublin for defamation in order to "stop false and malicious allegations about him online". In an interview for the Daily Telegraph in 2020, his lawyers stated that he plans to issue a complaint with the UK's information commissioner in relation to Google's alleged dissemination of "false and malicious allegations" .

In 2020, Soriano sued US-based Forensic News and several of its journalists for defamation and breaches of the European GDPR (General Data Protection Regulations). On 1 January 2021 the UK court handed down an opinion on whether the case could be brought in the UK, accepting that he could bring the Libel claim in UK courts, and stating that the other claims could not be brought. The Court of Appeal affirmed the jurisdictional issues in December 2021, and re-instituted the GDPR jurisdictional questions. On 30 June 2022 two reporters for Forensic News, Robert DeNault and Jess Coleman, issued public statements in which they apologized for their authoring role in the series of Forensic News posts concerning Walter Soriano, acknowledging that the publications were "based on circumstantial and inadequate evidence" that "has not been independently verified". The statements were issued as part of a settlement in which, in addition to the statements, both reporters agreed to remove from the Internet and their social media accounts all statements concerning Soriano over which they have control.

References

1967 births
Living people
British Jews
People from Golders Green
Argentine people